Anthophora fedorica is a species of anthophorine bee in the family Apidae. It is found in North America.

References

Further reading

 

Apinae
Insects described in 1906